Janeiro is the Portuguese word for January. It may also refer to:

"Janeiro", abbreviation for Rio de Janeiro or Rio de Janeiro (state)
Janeiro Tucker, Barbadian cricketer
"Janeiro" (song)
Janeiro de Baixo (pt), parish in Pampilhosa da Serra
Janeiro de Cima (pt), parish in Fundão, Portugal
Vale de Janeiro (pt), parish in Vinhais